Hector Alfredo Avila (born 17 April 1974) is an Argentine former professional boxer who competed from 1999 to 2016. At regional level, he held multiple championships, including the Argentinian cruiserweight title from 2005 to 2009.

Professional career
Avila faced former world title challenger Derek Chisora on 20 April 2013 at the Wembley Arena in London. Avila had one point deducted in the 6th round for holding and another in the 9th for use of the elbow, but was eventually stopped in the ninth round.

On March 1 2014, Avila faced Olympic gold medallist Anthony Joshua on the undercard of Ricky Burns against Terence Crawford, in Glasgow, Scotland. Avila lost the fight via a first-round KO.

Professional boxing record

References

External links
Hector Alfredo Avila on BoxRec

1975 births
Living people
Argentine male boxers
Heavyweight boxers